Jordan Edward Rodgers (born August 30, 1988) is an American sports commentator, television personality, and former professional American football quarterback. Rodgers signed with the Jacksonville Jaguars as an undrafted free agent in 2013, and also played on practice and preseason squads for the Tampa Bay Buccaneers and Miami Dolphins, as well as the BC Lions in the Canadian Football League. He is the younger brother of Green Bay Packers quarterback Aaron Rodgers.

Early years
Rodgers was born in Chico, California, and raised there with eldest brother Luke and their middle brother, Green Bay Packers quarterback Aaron Rodgers. Rodgers attended Pleasant Valley High School in Chico, where he started at quarterback and led the team to an 8–3–1 record as a senior while also lettering in basketball and  track.

College career
After completing high school, he attended and played quarterback at Butte College. At Butte, he was the backup quarterback when the team won the 2008 junior college national title with a 12–0 record. The following year as a starter, he broke the school record for total offense, passing for 2,219 yards and 19 touchdowns. He also earned academic honors.

After completing his two years at BCC, he transferred to Vanderbilt University after also considering the University of Kansas and Western Kentucky University.

In 2011, he began the season as the second-team quarterback and finished the season with seven starts. He completed 108 passes in 216 attempts for 1,524 yards with nine passing touchdowns and 10 interceptions and finished with a QBR of 113.80. He was also the team's second-leading rusher with 420 yards on 117 carries.

In 2012, he was named offensive co-captain. He started 11 games, becoming the first quarterback to lead the Commodores to back-to-back bowl appearances and a 9–4 record. His quarterback statistics were among the best in Vanderbilt history, with 191 completions, 2,539 yards and 15 touchdowns, completing 59.9 percent of his passes. Rodgers also threw for two touchdowns and ran for one in the team's win over North Carolina State in the Franklin American Mortgage Music City Bowl, which was the team's seventh consecutive win to end the season. His 2012 statistics rank #8 in the school's single season leaders.

Rodgers was an instrumental part of a SEC record while playing for the Commodores, serving as the primary quarterback for career SEC leading wide receiver Jordan Matthews. Once Rodgers became the starting quarterback in 2011, Matthews‘s production rapidly increased. In 2012, the two combined for 90 completions in a season where Matthews set the school record for receiving yards in a season with 1,323, a record he would break again the following year.

Despite playing only two seasons at Vanderbilt, he currently ranks 7th in school history in career total offense. He finished his career with 299 completions, 4,063 passing yards and 24 touchdown passes. His honors include the 2010, 2011 and 2012 SEC Academic Honor Roll and the 2012 Unitas Award Watch List.

His record as a starter was 11–8, with victories over fellow SEC teams Kentucky, Missouri, Tennessee, Auburn, and Mississippi.

Professional career

Jacksonville Jaguars
He was signed by the Jacksonville Jaguars as an undrafted free agent after the 2013 NFL Draft. He was released on July 22, 2013.

Tampa Bay Buccaneers
The Tampa Bay Buccaneers signed Rodgers to the team's practice squad on October 7, 2013 after releasing quarterback Josh Freeman. He remained on the practice squad for the remainder of the season as Mike Glennon became the starter and Dan Orlovsky the backup. Jordan was cut by the Buccaneers on February 10, 2014.

Miami Dolphins
On April 3, 2014, Rodgers was signed by the Miami Dolphins to challenge third-string quarterback Pat Devlin. He was cut on May 12, 2014.

BC Lions
On October 20, 2014, Rodgers was signed as a member of the BC Lions practice roster. After attending the team's mini-camp in April 2015, he quit.

In the media

Rodgers appeared in Pitch Perfect 2 as a member of the Green Bay Packers.

Rodgers was a contestant and the eventual winner on season 12 of The Bachelorette, starring Joelle "JoJo" Fletcher which aired from May–August 2016. Rodgers proposed; the two were married on May 14, 2022.

In September 2018, it was announced that Rodgers and Fletcher would appear in a Kin web series Engaged with JoJo and Jordan, described as a combination of reality TV and DIY home decor.

Beginning in July 2019, Rodgers and Fletcher hosted the CNBC reality show Cash Pad. A combination of house flipping and investment shows, the hosts partner with homeowners hoping to turn their properties into ideal short-term rentals.

Rodgers and Fletcher hosted The Big D, a dating reality show for TBS that was set to premiere on July 7, 2022. However, the show was canceled on June 16, three weeks before the premiere. Ten episodes were produced.

Broadcasting career
On August 2, 2016, Rodgers was hired by ESPN as a college football analyst for the news program SEC Now on the SEC Network.

References

1988 births
Living people
American football quarterbacks
Sportspeople from Chico, California
Players of American football from California
Canadian football quarterbacks
American players of Canadian football
ESPN people
Butte Roadrunners football players
Vanderbilt Commodores football players
Jacksonville Jaguars players
Tampa Bay Buccaneers players
Miami Dolphins players
BC Lions players
Reality show winners
College football announcers
Bachelor Nation contestants